Costovertebral may refer to:
Costovertebral joints, the articulations that connect the heads of the ribs with the bodies of the thoracic vertebrae
Costovertebral angle, the acute angle formed on either side of the human back between the twelfth rib and the vertebral column
Costovertebral angle tenderness, a medical sign of renal infection or renal stone